Arapahoe is an unincorporated town, a post office, and a census-designated place (CDP) located in and governed by Cheyenne County, Colorado, United States. The Arapahoe post office has the ZIP code 80802. At the United States Census 2010, the population of the 80802 ZIP Code Tabulation Area was 238 including adjacent areas.

History
The first town of Arapahoe was established in 1859 in Arapahoe County, Kansas Territory (present-day Jefferson County, Colorado; see Arapahoe, Colorado (ghost town).) The town withered in a few years.

A new town of Arapahoe was established at the present site in 1870.  The second Arapahoe post office opened on May 5, 1910.

The name honors the Arapaho Native American people who lived in the area.

Geography

Demographics

See also

Outline of Colorado
Index of Colorado-related articles
State of Colorado
Colorado cities and towns
Colorado census-designated places
Colorado counties
Cheyenne County, Colorado

References

External links

Arapahoe @ UncoverColorado.com
Cheyenne County website

Unincorporated communities in Cheyenne County, Colorado
Unincorporated communities in Colorado